Classification of Individual Consumption According to Purpose (COICOP) is a Reference Classification published by the United Nations Statistics Division that divides the purpose of individual consumption expenditures incurred by three institutional sectors, namely households, non-profit institutions serving households, and general government. 

Categories in COICOP generally correspond to categories in the UN's CPC. Division 14 of COICOP corresponds to the Classification of the Purposes of Non-Profit Institutions Serving Households (COPNI); Division 15 of COICOP corresponds to the Classification of the Functions of Government (COFOG).

The classification units are transactions.

COICOP has been recently revised and is now available as COICOP 2018.

Structure

Structure levels
Structure Level 1: Divisions (two-digit)
Structure Level 2: Groups (three-digit)
Structure Level 3: Classes (four-digit)
Structure Level 4: Subclasses (five-digit)

Broad structure
01 Food and non-alcoholic beverages
01.1 Food
01.2 Non-alcoholic beverages
01.3 Services for processing primary goods for food and non-alcoholic beverages
02 Alcoholic beverages, tobacco and narcotics
02.1 Alcoholic beverages
02.2 Alcohol production services
02.3 Tobacco
02.4 Narcotics
03 Clothing and footwear
03.1 Clothing
03.2 Footwear
04 Housing, water, electricity, gas and other fuels
04.1 Actual rentals for housing
04.2 Imputed rentals for housing
04.3 Maintenance, repair and security of the dwelling
04.4 Water supply and miscellaneous services relating to the dwelling
04.5 Electricity, gas and other fuels
05 Furnishings, household equipment and routine household maintenance
05.1 Furniture, furnishings, and loose carpets
05.2 Household textiles
05.3 Household appliances
05.4 Glassware, tableware and household utensils
05.5 Tools and equipment for house and garden
05.6 Goods and services for routine household maintenance
06 Health
06.1 Medicines and health products
06.2 Outpatient care services
06.3 Inpatient care services
06.4 Other health services
07 Transport
07.1 Purchase of vehicles
07.2 Operation of personal transport equipment
07.3 Passenger transport services
07.4 Transport services of goods
08 Information and communication
08.1 Information and communication equipment
08.2 Software excluding games
08.3 Information and communication services
09 Recreation, sport and culture
09.1 Recreational durables
09.2 Other recreational goods
09.3 Garden products and pets
09.4 Recreational services
09.5 Cultural goods
09.6 Cultural services
09.7 Newspapers, books and stationery
09.8 Package holidays
10 Education services
10.1 Early childhood and primary education
10.2 Secondary education
10.3 Post-secondary non-tertiary education
10.4 Tertiary education
10.5 Education not defined by level
11 Restaurants and accommodation services
11.1 Food and beverage serving services
11.2 Accommodation services
12 Insurance and financial services
12.1 Insurance
12.2 Financial services
13 Personal care, social protection and miscellaneous goods and services
13.1 Personal care
13.2 Other personal effects
13.3 Social protection
13.9 Other services
14 Individual consumption expenditure of non-profit institutions serving households (NPISHS)
14.1 Housing
14.2 Health
14.3 Recreation and culture
14.4 Education
14.5 Social protection
14.6 Other services
15 Individual consumption expenditure of general government
15.1 Housing
15.2 Health
15.3 Recreation and culture
15.4 Education
15.5 Social protection

External links
United Nations Statistics Division
COICOP 2018 Revision Website.

United Nations Economic and Social Council
Economic taxonomy
Product classifications